5α-Dihydronandrolone (also known as 5α-DHN, dihydronandrolone, DHN, 5α-dihydro-19-nortestosterone, or 5α-estran-17β-ol-3-one) is a naturally occurring anabolic–androgenic steroid (AAS) and a 5α-reduced derivative of nandrolone (19-nortestosterone). It is a major metabolite of nandrolone and is formed from it by the actions of the enzyme 5α-reductase analogously to the formation of dihydrotestosterone (DHT) from testosterone.

When testosterone is 5α-reduced into DHT, which is a much more potent AAS in comparison, its effects are potentiated on a local level. The tissues in which this occurs (i.e., the tissues that express 5α-reductase) are referred to as "androgenic" tissues and include the skin, hair follicles, and prostate gland, among others. The conversion of testosterone into DHT is an important factor in the etiology of a variety of androgen-dependent conditions, including acne, excessive facial/body hair growth, scalp hair loss, prostate enlargement, and prostate cancer. Unlike the case of testosterone and DHT, 5α-DHN is a much weaker agonist of the androgen receptor (AR) than is nandrolone. For this reason, instead of local potentiation in androgenic tissues, there is a local inactivation when nandrolone is converted into 5α-DHN by 5α-reductase in these tissues. This is thought to be largely or completely responsible for the exceptionally high ratio of anabolic to androgenic effects seen with nandrolone.

The combination of nandrolone with a 5α-reductase inhibitor like finasteride or dutasteride will block the conversion of nandrolone into 5α-DHN and, unlike with testosterone and various other AAS, thereby considerably increase the propensity of nandrolone for producing androgenic side effects.

See also
 19-Norandrosterone
 19-Noretiocholanolone
 5α-Dihydronorethandrolone
 5α-Dihydronorethisterone
 5α-Dihydrolevonorgestrel
 5α-Dihydroethisterone

References

5α-Reduced steroid metabolites
Cyclopentanols
Androgens and anabolic steroids
Estranes
Human drug metabolites
Ketones